The Emblem of Haryana is the official seal of the government of the Indian state of Haryana.

Design
The emblem consists of a circular shield depicting a lotus blossom emerging out of water in front of a rising sun. The shield is supported by ears of wheat and the Lion Capital of Ashoka forms the crest.

Government banner
The Government of Haryana can be represented by a banner displaying the emblem of the state on a white field.

See also
 National Emblem of India
 List of Indian state emblems

References

Government of Haryana
Haryana
Symbols of Haryana